Sindh Coastal Development Authority is responsible for development projects on coastal areas of Sindh, Pakistan.

See also 
 Government of Sindh
 Sindh Information Department

External links 
 Sindh Coastal Development Authority

References 

Government agencies of Sindh